Mike Warren (born August 22, 1980) is a product designer, inventor, and best-selling author based in San Francisco. He builds functional open source prototypes in line with the maker culture, and are carefully documented to inspire others to follow along. As an advocate for sharing educational content, his work aims to lower the barrier to participation, and transfer a static audience to an active participant.

His most notable designs include the Glow Table, a glow in the dark (phosphorescence) table made from photoluminescent powder mixed with clear casting resin set into Pecky Cypress, and the Flamethrower Skateboard, a skateboard with a built in fuel delivery system with an ignitor that leaves a trail of fire behind it when riding.

Mike Warren is the author of several published  maker books for all ages, and has also designed and edited two books for Instructables.

Achievements 
In 2020, Warren collaborated with the Bay Area Discovery Museum to create an exhibit loosely based on his book, Cut In Half: The Hidden World Inside Everyday Objects. The  How Things Work exhibit features everyday household items cut in half revealing new and unique views of ordinary objects

His book Cut In Half (based on the YouTube show of the same name) was an 2018 Amazon best-seller in the Science & Math department, under the Experiments, Instruments & Measurements category. The book was also featured in Make (magazine), Real Simple, Duluth Trading Company, Florida Weekly Newspaper.

Mike Warren won The New York Times Innovation Whiteboard in 2012 for his umbrella light, an illumination device retrofitted into the shaft of an umbrella to indicate location to others in the dark. This product was selected by James Dyson, calling it "a good precaution for pedestrians at night or in fog — and a bright idea in the evolution of the umbrella."

Notable Projects 
Mike Warren has built videos available on his YouTube channel.

Warren released the Flamethrower Skateboard in 2017, a skateboard that leaves a fire trail similar to the DeLorean time machine from the Back To The Future movies. The dangerous nature of the skateboard has received mostly positive reviews, with some critical about the safety of leaving unattended flames and the risk of starting fires.

In 2014, Warren created a glow in the dark (phosphorescence) table made from photoluminescent powder mixed with clear casting resin set into Pecky Cypress. This table was later republished in Wired UK magazine in 2015. The video tutorial has over 2.5 million views.

In 2014, Warren built a centrifuge from an old circular saw. The centrifuge was designed as a molecular gastronomy experiment to separate food, and can achieve 1800 g-force.

In 2012, Warren was featured in Popular Science Magazine for his project concealing a battery operated soldering iron inside an airsoft gun. The airsoft pistol had a removable ammunition clip which the batteries for the soldering iron were hidden, the trigger action activated the soldering iron.

Published works

 DIY Wilderness Survival Projects: 15 Step-By-Step Projects for the Great Outdoors (Maker) (2021) - Welbeck Publishing, 160 pages, 
 Cut In Half: The Hidden World Inside Everyday Objects (2018) - Chronicle Books, 144 pages, 
 Dude Crafts: The Man's Guide to Practical Projects, Backyard Ballistics, and Glorious Gags: (2018) -   Voyageur Press; New edition, 192 pages, 
 The Gadget Inventor Handbook: (2017) - Sterling Children's Books, 64 pages, 
 23 Things To Do Before You are 11 : (2015) - QEB Publishing, 64 pages, 
 Office Weapons (2013) - Skyhorse Publishing, 160 pages, 
 Backyard Rockets (2013) - Skyhorse Publishing, 208 pages,

References

External links
Instructables Projects (mikeasaurus)
Amazon Author page
YouTube channel

1980 births
Living people